William Illingworth may refer to:

 William H. Illingworth (1844–1893), English photographer 
 William Illingworth (archivist) (1764–1845), English lawyer and archivist